Robert Samuel James Houston McKelvey, OBE, QVRM, TD (born 3 September 1942) was the Dean of Belfast.

He was educated at the Royal Belfast Academical Institution (1954–61), Queen's University Belfast, 1961-65 and Trinity College, Dublin and ordained in 1968.

He was Curate at Dunmurry until 1970, when he was appointed Rector of Kilmakee- a post he held for 12 years. He was Secretary of the  General Synod Board of Education (Northern Ireland) from then until 2001 when he became Dean of Belfast, in which capacity he served at St Anne's Cathedral until 2011. During his tenure as Dean of Belfast he was at times involved in controversy, notably in 2003 (relating to perceived lack of government support for St Anne's as a tourist attraction), and in 2010-11 (relating to the departure of the composer Philip Stopford, who had been the Director of Music). In connection with the latter matter, he faced demands that he resign.

An author, he is married to Roberta; they have a son.

He served as editor of The Church of Ireland Gazette from 1975 to 1982.

References

1942 births
People educated at the Royal Belfast Academical Institution
Alumni of Queen's University Belfast
Alumni of Trinity College Dublin
Deans of Belfast
Living people